The 2011 UEFA Women's Under-17 Championship was the fourth edition of the UEFA Women's Under-17 Championship. Spain was the title holder. Like the previous tournaments, there were two qualifying rounds.

Qualification

First qualifying round
Forty teams entered in this round. There were ten groups of four teams each. The ten champions and the five best runners-up advanced to the second qualifying round. Germany had a bye to the second round.

Teams in italics hosted the mini-tournament.  All match times listed are CET.

Group 1

Group 2

Group 3

Group 4

Group 5

Group 6

Group 7

Group 8

Group 9

Group 10

Ranking of group runners-up
To determine the five best runners-up from the first qualifying round, only the results against the winners and third-placed teams in each group were taken into account and the following criteria apply:
higher number of points obtained in these matches
superior goal difference from these matches
higher number of goals scored in these matches
fair play conduct of the teams in all group matches in the first qualifying round
drawing of lots

The best runners-up were confirmed by UEFA on 22 October 2010.

Second qualifying round
The ten group winners and the five best runners-up joined Germany in the second round. There were four groups of four teams each. The four group winners advanced to the final round. The draw was held on 16 November 2010.

Group 1

Group 2

Group 3

Group 4

Final round

The four group champions played the knockout stage in the Centre sportif de Colovray Nyon, Nyon, Switzerland from 28 to 31 July 2011. There were two semifinals, a third place match and the final. The pairings were determined by the regulations, there was no draw held for the finals.

Semifinals

Third place match

Final

References

External links
UEFA.com; official website
Tournament Regulations

2011
U
Uefa
2011
UEFA
2011 in youth sport
July 2011 sports events in Europe
2011 in youth association football